L'Officiel is a French fashion magazine. It has been published in Paris since 1921 and targets upper-income, educated women aged from 25 to 49. In 2012, it had a circulation of 59,710. A men's edition of L'Officiel, L'Officiel Hommes, and many foreign editions are also published. The complete name of the magazine is "L'Officiel de la couture et de la mode de Paris". In 2022, it was acquired by Hong KongBased company AMTD International.

History
L'Officiel was first published in 1921, the same year as Vogue Paris. It was the official publication of the Chambre Syndicale de la Couture Parisienne, a trade body representing all Paris couturiers, and took over the role of Les Elégances Parisiennes, a joint publication of a group of about twenty-five couturiers which became defunct in 1922. L'Officiel was a professional trade magazine, directed principally at international buyers of high fashion, both corporate and individual, and at those working in the fashion industry. The director was Max Bruhne, and the chief editor Yves-Georges Prade.

Georges Jalou joined the magazine as artistic director in 1932. Within a short time it had helped to start the careers of designers such as Pierre Balmain, Cristóbal Balenciaga, Christian Dior, and Yves St. Laurent, and came to be known as "the Bible of fashion and of high society". Jalou became general director of the publication, and later bought it. He transferred it to his three children in 1986: Laurent Jalou became the president of Editions Jalou, Marie-José Susskind-Jalou directed its editorial content, and Maxime Jalou was responsible for publication. After the death of Laurent Jalou in 2003, his daughter Marie-José Susskind-Jalou became president of the company, and restructured the magazine's content to target a younger market than it did in its early years.

An American edition, L'Officiel USA, was launched in 2017 with funding from Global Emerging Markets, an investment group; it is published from the New York City offices of the group.

In January 2021 some freelancers working for the magazine took legal action action in France, claiming that they had not been paid.

In December 2021 the City of New York brought an action against L'Officiel USA Inc. under the Freelance Isn't Free Act, claiming that the magazine had failed to pay freelance contributors.

International Editions 
List of the International Editions of the magazine & their editors over time. Most editions are licensed but some (France, Brazil, USA, Italy, Malaysia & more are directly managed)

Other International editions

 Central Asia
 Ukraine
 Morocco
 Italy

Other Editions 

 L'Officiel Hommes
 L'Officiel Art
 L’Officiel Voyage
 L’Officiel 1000 Modèles
 L’Officiel Shopping
 L’Officiel 1000 Modèles Design

References

External links
 magazine Archive (back issues in French)
 L'Officiel Official website french
 L'Officiel Official website USA

1921 establishments in France
Women's fashion magazines
French-language magazines
Monthly magazines published in France
Magazines established in 1921
Magazines published in Paris
Women's magazines published in France
2022 mergers and acquisitions